Old IRA may refer to:
 Irish Republican Army (1919–1922), retronym "Old IRA" distinguishes it from later organisations using the name IRA
 National Association of Old IRA, made up of veterans of the IRA from the revolutionary period.

See also
 Irish Republican Army (disambiguation) other organisations of the name
 Traditional IRA, the original form of individual retirement arrangement (IRA) established in the United States by the Employee Retirement Income Security Act of 1974 
 Ira (name), "old Ira" may be a pet name